The women's 10,000 metres event featured at the 1995 World Championships in Gothenburg, Sweden. There were a total number of 34 participating athletes, and the two qualifying heats and the final were held on 9 August 1995.

Final

Qualifying heats
Held on Sunday 1995-08-06

See also
 1991 Women's World Championships 10.000 metres (Tokyo)
 1992 Women's Olympic 10.000 metres (Barcelona)
 1993 Women's World Championships 10.000 metres (Stuttgart)
 1994 Women's European Championships 10.000 metres (Helsinki)
 1996 Women's Olympic 10.000 metres (Atlanta)
 1997 Women's World Championships 10.000 metres (Athens)

References
 Results

 
10,000 metres at the World Athletics Championships
1995 in women's athletics